Super Uba is a Dominican bachata and merengue singer-songwriter.

Bachata musicians
20th-century Dominican Republic male singers
Living people
Year of birth missing (living people)

Reference